Michael L Payne (born 1941), is a male former swimmer who competed for England.

Swimming career
He represented England in the 110 yards backstroke at the 1958 British Empire and Commonwealth Games in Cardiff, Wales.

He swam for the Bristol Central Club.

References

1941 births
English male swimmers
Swimmers at the 1958 British Empire and Commonwealth Games
Living people
Commonwealth Games competitors for England